Jordanoleiopus is a genus of beetles in the family Cerambycidae, containing the following species:

subgenus Jordanoleiopus
 Jordanoleiopus africanus (Jordan, 1894)
 Jordanoleiopus alboscutellaris Breuning, 1977
 Jordanoleiopus binigromaculipennis Breuning, 1977
 Jordanoleiopus catops (Jordan, 1903)
 Jordanoleiopus fenestrella (Jordan, 1903)
 Jordanoleiopus fuscosparsutus Breuning, 1970
 Jordanoleiopus maynei Lepesme & Breuning, 1955
 Jordanoleiopus mocquerysi (Jordan, 1894)
 Jordanoleiopus pantosi Breuning, 1958

subgenus Paraphelileiopus
 Jordanoleiopus hautmanni Breuning, 1956
 Jordanoleiopus paraphelis (Jordan, 1903)

subgenus Polymistoleiopus
 Jordanoleiopus abyssinicus Breuning, 1961
 Jordanoleiopus alboreductus (Lepesme & Breuning, 1953)
 Jordanoleiopus albosuturalis Breuning, 1955
 Jordanoleiopus antennalis (Jordan, 1894)
 Jordanoleiopus benjamini Breuning, 1956
 Jordanoleiopus bifuscoplagiatus Báguena & Breuning, 1958
 Jordanoleiopus brunneicolor Breuning, 1969
 Jordanoleiopus conradti (Aurivillius, 1907)
 Jordanoleiopus endroedyi Breuning, 1972
 Jordanoleiopus feai Breuning, 1955
 Jordanoleiopus femoralis Hunt & Breuning, 1957
 Jordanoleiopus flavescens Breuning, 1955
 Jordanoleiopus flavomaculatus Hunt & Breuning, 1957
 Jordanoleiopus flavosignatus Breuning, 1977
 Jordanoleiopus flavosuturalis Breuning, 1958
 Jordanoleiopus fuscomaculatus Breuning, 1957
 Jordanoleiopus fuscosignatipennis Breuning, 1971
 Jordanoleiopus fuscosignatus Breuning, 1964
 Jordanoleiopus gabonensis Breuning, 1977
 Jordanoleiopus gabonicus Breuning, 1958
 Jordanoleiopus gardneri Breuning, 1958
 Jordanoleiopus inmbae Breuning, 1955
 Jordanoleiopus ivorensis Breuning, 1968
 Jordanoleiopus kivuensis Breuning, 1956
 Jordanoleiopus leonensis Breuning, 1957
 Jordanoleiopus machadoi Breuning, 1959
 Jordanoleiopus mirei Breuning, 1977
 Jordanoleiopus monoxenus Breuning, 1977
 Jordanoleiopus multinigromaculatus Breuning, 1977
 Jordanoleiopus niger Breuning, 1969
 Jordanoleiopus orientalis Breuning, 1957
 Jordanoleiopus partesuturalis Breuning, 1956
 Jordanoleiopus polymistus (Distant, 1905)
 Jordanoleiopus quadriflavomaculatus Breuning, 1958
 Jordanoleiopus rufofemoralis Breuning, 1977
 Jordanoleiopus rufofemoratus Breuning, 1958
 Jordanoleiopus rufotibialis Breuning, 1977
 Jordanoleiopus subunicolor Breuning, 1955
 Jordanoleiopus testui Breuning, 1977
 Jordanoleiopus ugandicola Breuning, 1964
 Jordanoleiopus unicolor Breuning, 1956
 Jordanoleiopus villiersi (Lepesme & Breuning, 1953)
 Jordanoleiopus zanzibaricus Breuning, 1967

References

 
Acanthocinini